= Rachel Weissbrod =

Rachel Weissbrod (Hebrew: רחל ויסברוד) is an Israeli translation scholar.

Weissbrod holds a Ph.D. in translation studies from Tel Aviv University. She is a researcher at Bar-Ilan University.

== Selected works ==
- Multimodal Experiences Across Cultures, Spaces and Identities (with Ayelet Kohn). Routledge, 2023.
- Translating the Visual A Multimodal Perspective (with Ayelet Kohn). Routledge, 2019.
- Illustrations and the written text as reciprocal translation. Two illustrated versions of Anonymous Belfi ha-Gadol (with Ayelet Kohn). In: The Fictions of Translation (edited by Judy Woodsworth). Benjamins Translation Library, 2018.
- Translation Studies and mass media research. In: Why Translation Studies Matter (Edited by Daniel Gile, Gyde Hansen and Nike K. Pokorn). Benjamins Translation Library, 2010.
- Translation Research in the Framework of the Tel Aviv School of Poetics and Semiotics. In: Meta, Volume 43, Number 1, March 1998.
